Daryl Joseph (born 16 May 1966) is a Antigua and Barbuda boxer. He competed in the men's welterweight event at the 1988 Summer Olympics.

References

External links
 

1966 births
Living people
Antigua and Barbuda male boxers
Olympic boxers of Antigua and Barbuda
Boxers at the 1988 Summer Olympics
Place of birth missing (living people)
Welterweight boxers